Off Menu with Ed Gamble and James Acaster is a food and comedy podcast featuring Ed Gamble and James Acaster, in which guests are invited to select their dream menu by both comedians. Off Menu was launched in December 2018 and was nominated for the 2019 British Podcast Awards in the Best Entertainment category. As of April 2021, the podcast has been downloaded over 50 million times.

Premise
In the show, guests are asked by Acaster's Genie Waiter if they would like "still or sparkling water" and "poppadoms or bread". They then proceed to give their dream starter, main course, side dish, drink and dessert, expand upon where and when they had it, and are given the opportunity to discuss the evocative memories they associate with the chosen dishes.

Before the guest arrives Ed and James announce a secret ingredient that at least one of them does not like. If the guest mentions the ingredient they are ejected from the Dream Restaurant without getting any dinner. To date, the only guest to have been ejected from Dream Restaurant is Jayde Adams.

Episodes
A wide range of guests have 'eaten at the dream restaurant', including comedians, chefs and other figures. Ed and James chose their own menus as part of a special episode to celebrate 100 episodes of the show. A list of episodes, guests and menus is maintained on the official Reddit page of the podcast.

Accolades
In 2022 and 2023 it received a nomination in the Best Comedy Podcast category at the National Comedy Awards.

See also
List of food podcasts

References

External links

Comedy and humor podcasts
2018 podcast debuts
Audio podcasts
British podcasts